Laura Beyne; (born 25 May 1992) is a Belgian beauty pageant titleholder who was crowned Miss Belgium 2012 and represented her country in the 2012 Miss Universe and Miss World pageants. She is also a TV host and has been the host of Belgian TV shows Place Royale and Plug People.

Early life
Beyne was born in Brussels. She speaks English, French and Dutch. Her father is Belgian, her mother Congolese.

Miss Belgium 2012
Beyne was crowned Miss Belgium 2012 by Justine De Jonckheere (Miss Belgium 2011) at the Casino de Knokke in Knokke-Heist on 8 January 2012. Beyne represented Belgium in Miss World 2012 in Ordos, Inner Mongolia on 18 August 2012. She was the second black person to win Miss Belgium.

Miss Universe 2012
Beyne represented Belgium in Miss Universe 2012 held in Las Vegas.

Television career 
In February 2020, she was the host of a TV show about Whitney Houston called Whitney, My Idol, on Belgian TV station RTL-TVI. It was her first gig as a TV host.

In June 2021, she became the co-host of TV show Place Royale. For her first episode, she tested positive for Covid-19, and unable to do filming, so only her voice was used.

In November 2021, it was announced that she would be the host of a Belgian TV show called Plug People.

References

External links
Official Miss Belgium website

1992 births
Living people
Belgian beauty pageant winners
Miss Universe 2012 contestants
Miss World 2012 delegates
Belgian people of Democratic Republic of the Congo descent
Models from Brussels
Miss Belgium winners